Edmund Birkhead, D.D. was Bishop of St Asaph from 1513 until 1518.

Birkhead was born in Cheshire and educated at the University of Cambridge. He was buried at Wrexham.

References

External links 

16th-century Welsh Anglican priests
Bishops of St Asaph
Alumni of the University of Cambridge
People from Cheshire